Faith is an English feminine given name derived from the word faith. It became popularized when the Puritans began using it as a virtue name during the 17th century. Puritans also used Faith as part of longer phrase names, such as Be-faithful, Faithful, Faith-my-joy, and Fight-the-good-fight-of-faith.

The name is also the usual English translation of the Greek name of Saint Faith, an early Christian child martyr who was tortured to death along with her sisters Hope and Charity. She is known as Pistis in Greek and Fides in Church Latin and her name is translated differently in other languages.

Faith, Hope and Charity, the three theological virtues, are names traditionally given to triplet girls, just as Faith and Hope remain common names for twin girls. There were 40 sets of twins named Faith and Hope born in the United States in 2009, the second most common name combination for twin girls. In 2011, there were 33 sets of twin girls named Faith and Hope in the United States, the fourth most common name combination for twins. One example were the American triplets Faith, Hope and Charity Cardwell, who were born in 1899 in Texas and were recognized in 1994 by the Guinness Book of World Records as the world's longest lived triplets.

Faith has been a consistently popular name for girls in the United States, ranking among the top 1,000 names since 1880 and the top 500 names since 1921. It has ranked among the top 100 names in the United States since 1999 and was ranked as the 71st most popular name for newborn girls in 2011.

Other cultures also give names in reference to religious faith. The name Iman is used by Muslims for both boys and girls in reference to faith in Islam.

References

English feminine given names
Virtue names